Ambedkar Nagar is a village located in Phalodi Tehsil of Jodhpur district, Rajasthan, India.

As of 2011 India census the Ambedkar Nagar had a population of 348 which 180 are males while 168 are females. There's 62 house in Ambedkar Nagar. the village was named after Babasaheb Ambedkar.

References 

Villages in Jodhpur district